Rull is a municipality in the southern part of the island Yap, Federated States of Micronesia.

Rull may also refer to:

People
 Bartolomé Rull (1691–1769), bishop of Malta
 Ernst-Eduard Rull (1894–1986), Estonian sport shooter
 Johann Baptist Ruel (also called de Ruel or de Rull; 1634–1685), Flemish painter 
 Josep Rull (born 1968), Spanish politician from Catalonia
 Peter Rull Sr. (1922–2014), Olympian sport shooter
 Peter Rull Jr. (born 1945), Olympian sport shooter

Other
 Rudl or rull, a Norwegian folk dance

See also